Kåre Fostervold (born 10 October 1969 in Porsgrunn) is a Norwegian politician for the Progress Party.

He was elected to the Norwegian Parliament from Telemark in 2005.

On the local level Fostervold was a member Porsgrunn municipality council from 1999 to 2007.

Outside politics he has worked as an electrician.

References

1969 births
Living people
Members of the Storting
Progress Party (Norway) politicians
Politicians from Telemark
Politicians from Porsgrunn
21st-century Norwegian politicians